It Ain’t over Till It’s Over is a solo album by Fast Eddie Clarke, former Motörhead and Fastway guitarist. Lemmy guests on "Laugh at the Devil".

Track listing
 "Snakebite"
 "Lying Ain't Right"
 "Back on the Road"
 "Naturally"
 "All over Bar the Shouting"
 "Make My Day"
 "Laugh at the Devil"
 "No Satisfaction"
 "Lessons"
 "Hot Straight and Normal"
 "In The City"
 "It Ain't over Till It's Over"

The line is based on a Yogiism, or quotation from Yogi Berra: "It ain't over till it's over."

Personnel
 Eddie Clarke – guitar, vocals
 Mel Gabbitas – bass
 Pete Riley – drums
 John Sloman – backing vocals
with:
Lemmy - vocals on "Laugh at the Devil"

Notes

Fast Eddie Clarke albums
1994 albums